Ötztal is a railway station on the Arlberg railway between Innsbruck and Bludenz in Tyrol, Austria. In Ötztal the second track coming from Innsbruck ends and the Arlberg line continues as a single-track railway till Landeck.

Services

Rail services 
Ötztal provides regional connections to Innsbruck–Hall in Tirol–Rosenheim and Landeck as well as international destinations like Zürich, Basel, Dortmund and Vienna.

It is serviced by:
InterCityExpress: Vienna–Innsbruck–Bregenz
ÖBB-EuroCity: Vienna/Graz–Innsbruck–Feldkirch–Bregenz/Zürich–Basel (CH)
EuroNight: Vienna/Graz–Innsbruck–Feldkirch–Bregenz/Zürich (CH)
InterCity: Innsbruck–Dortmund/Münster (D)

Bus services 
Coach lines departing from the station forecourt:
Oetz–Umhausen–Längenfeld–Sölden–Obergurgl
Oetz–Ochsengarten
Roppen–Imst
Haiming–Silz–Mötz

See also 

Arlberg railway
Ötztal

Railway stations in Tyrol (state)